The Exemplary Band of the National Guard of the Republic of Kazakhstan (Kazakh: Қазақстан Республикасының Ұлттық гвардиясының үлгілі оркестрі, Russian: Образцово-показательный оркестр Национальной гвардии Республики Казахстан) is a military music unit made for state ceremonies carried out by the National Guard of Kazakhstan.

It was founded in 1965, as the band of the Internal Troops of the Kazakh SSR and is currently one of the leading musical groups of the Kazakh Armed Forces. Since its inception, the band has repeatedly performed military music on behalf of the Kazakh Internal Troops and the National Guard of Kazakhstan. The band is recognized notably for its dark and light blue uniform.

It has repeatedly taken part at various contests and festivals of military bands, including the International Festival of Brass Bands in St. Petersburg (12 June 2017) and the Shanghai Cooperation Organization Military Tattoo (2014–17). In 2015 and 2018, the band was invited to be a participant in The Amur Waves International Military Bands Festival. Furthermore, it performed at the 2019 Spasskaya Tower Festival.

Besides the central band, which is the seniormost of the bands of the National Guard, the band is also divided into the following sub-units:

 Band of the Military Institute of the National Guard
 Band of the Regional Command "Ortaly"
 Band of the Regional Command "Otjustik"
 Band of the Regional Command "Batys"
 Band of the Regional Command "Shygys"

See also 
 National Guard of Kazakhstan
 Presidential Orchestra of the State Security Service of the Republic of Kazakhstan
 Central Military Band of the Ministry of Defense of Kazakhstan
 Military band
 Military Band Service (Kazakhstan)

External links 
Военные музыканты Казахстана покоряют международные вершины | Әскер KZ

References 

Kazakhstani military bands
Military units and formations established in 1965
1965 establishments in the Soviet Union
Musical groups established in 1965